Maria Konstantatou (born 3 February 1981) is a Greek diver. She competed in the women's 10 metre platform event at the 2000 Summer Olympics.

References

1981 births
Living people
Greek female divers
Olympic divers of Greece
Divers at the 2000 Summer Olympics
Place of birth missing (living people)